3x3 basketball competitions at the 2019 World Beach Games in Doha, Qatar were scheduled to be held from October 10 to October 13. The venue for the competition was located at Mission Beach. A total of sixteen men's and sixteen women's teams (each consisting up to 4 athletes) competed in each tournament. This means a total of 128 athletes were scheduled to compete.

Qualification
Each National Olympic Committee was able to enter up to one men's and one women's team in the 3x3 basketball tournaments. The qualification processes for the men's and women's events were similar. The host country was guaranteed an entry in each event. Top four per gender from Africa, Europe and Asia-Pacific) on 1 November 
2018 should obtain one quota place for that gender. The region to which the host country belongs (Americas) got only three (3) quota places per gender for their NOC in addition to the host country.

Men's qualification

Women's qualification

Medal summary

Medal table

Medalists

Participating nations
A total of 128 athletes from 21 nations were scheduled to participate (the numbers of athletes are shown in parentheses).

References

External links
Results book

3x3 basketball competitions
3x3 basketball
World Beach Games
2019